David Simpson may refer to:
 David Simpson (priest) (1745–1799), English priest
 David F. Simpson (1860–1925), American jurist
 David Simpson (Canadian politician) (1910–1965), Canadian politician
 David Simpson (Northern Ireland politician) (born 1959), Democratic Unionist Party politician in Northern Ireland
 David Simpson (Texas politician) (born 1961), Texas Representative
 Dave Simpson (ice hockey) (born 1962), Canadian ice hockey player
 David Simpson (footballer, born 1963), Australian rules footballer for Richmond
 David Simpson (footballer, born 1965), Australian rules footballer for Geelong
 Dave Simpson (soccer) (born 1983), Canadian soccer player
 David Simpson (cricketer) (born 1983), Irish cricketer
 David Simpson (artist) (born 1928), American artist
 Dana Simpson (David Craig Simpson, born 1977), American cartoonist
 David Capell Simpson (1883–1955), British biblical scholar, academic and Church of England clergyman